Ngor (honorable) is a commune d'arrondissement of the city of Dakar, Senegal. As of 2013 it had a population of 17,383. The westernmost point of the African continent is located there. Ngor is one of the four original Lebou villages of the Cap-Vert Peninsula, along with Yoff, Hann, and Ouakam. It includes the small .

Ngor's recorded history dates back to 1550 when migrants from the interior of Senegal including the Walo, Cayor, Jolof (also as Djolof or Wolof) and Baol came into the Cap-Vert peninsula.

Sports club
The most notable football club is Olympique de Ngor, the club once played at the First Division of Senegal and later Ligue 1 (Premier League) and was relegated in 2016 to Ligue 2 where they currently play.  Another club named Almadies who once played in the First Division up to around the 1970s was based in Ngor.

Notable people
Diogal Sakho, musician

References

Further reading
 C. T. Mbengue, "An introduction to the traditional villages of Yoff, Ngor and Ouakam ", R. Register and B. Peeks (under the direction of), Village wisdom, future cities, 1996, Third Ecoville-Ecovillage (Écoville-Écovillage) International Conference at Yoff, Sénégal, Ecocity Builders, Oakland, California, p. 82–85. 
 Jean-Louis Acquier, Ngor, village de la grande banlieue de Dakar : traditions et mutations, University of Bordeaux, 1971, p. 250 p.
 Fatou Seye Mbow, Évolution des villages lébou du Cap-Vert : le cas de Ngor [Evolution of Lebou Village of the Cap-Vert Peninsula]', Dakar, University of Dapar, 1983, p. 168

External links
Official website

Arrondissements of Dakar